Strychnos mellodora is a species of plant in the Loganiaceae family. It is found in Kenya, Mozambique, Tanzania, and Zimbabwe.

References

mellodora
Vulnerable plants
Taxonomy articles created by Polbot